The 2019 Moldovan Super Cup was the 11th Moldovan Super Cup, an annual Moldovan football match played by the winner of the national football league (the National Division) and the winner of the national Cup. The match was played between Sheriff Tiraspol, champions of the 2018 National Division, and Milsami Orhei, winners of the 2017–18 Moldovan Cup. It was  held at the Sheriff Small Arena on 10 March 2019. 

Milsami Orhei won 5–4 on penalties, after the match finished 0–0 after 90 minutes.

Match

References

2018–19 in Moldovan football
FC Milsami Orhei matches
FC Sheriff Tiraspol matches
Moldovan Super Cup
Association football penalty shoot-outs